"Angel Eyes" is a song by Canadian duo Denis and Denyse LePage (then husband and wife) recording as Lime. The song was the second single from their third album Lime III in 1983 and peaked at #12 on the Billboard Dance Music Chart in  November of that year. The record received an epic club remix by noted duo M and M in 1985.

References

1983 songs
PolyGram singles
1983 singles